MFK Vyškov is a Czech football club located in the town of Vyškov in the South Moravian Region. It currently plays in the Czech National Football League, the second level of Czech football.

History
The club changed names on 1 January 2012, changing from SK Rostex Vyškov to MFK Vyškov. Since 2017, the club has been owned by Rainbow World Group who also own Cameroonian side Rainbow FC.

In the 2020–21 season of the MSFL, which was unfinished because of the COVID-19 pandemic measures, Vyškov finished first in the incomplete table and was offered participation in the Czech National Football League, which the club accepted.

Historical names
 1931–1938: SK Vyškov
 1939–1949: HSK (Hanácký sportovní klub)
 1949–1953: Sokol Vyškov
 1953–1966: Slavoj Vyškov
 1966–1993: TJ Vyškov
 1993–2011: SK Rostex Vyškov
 2012: MFK Vyškov

Czech Cup
Vyškov has taken part in the Czech Cup a number of times, reaching the third round in the 2006–07 edition.

Players

Current squad

Out on loan

References

External links
Official website 
Club profile at jihomoravskyfotbal.cz

MFK Vyškov
Football clubs in the Czech Republic
Association football clubs established in 1931
Vyškov
1931 establishments in Czechoslovakia